Alain Acart (sometimes shown as Alain Acard; 28 March 1951 – 2 January 2023) was a French sprint canoer who competed in the 1970s. He won a bronze medal in the C-2 10000 m event at the 1974 ICF Canoe Sprint World Championships in Mexico City.

Competing in two Summer Olympics, Acart earned his best finish of fourth in the semifinal event in C-2 1000 m event at Montreal in 1976. and now, July 18, 2002.

Acart died from a heart attack on 2 January 2023, at the age of 71.

References

Sources

External links
 

1951 births
2023 deaths
Canoeists at the 1972 Summer Olympics
Canoeists at the 1976 Summer Olympics
French male canoeists
Olympic canoeists of France
ICF Canoe Sprint World Championships medalists in Canadian